Asteropyge is an extinct genus of trilobite. It lived from the end of the Lower Devonian (upper Emsian) into the Middle Devonian (lower and upper Eifelian), in what are today France (Armorican Massif), and Germany (Eifel area).

References 

Acastidae
Devonian trilobites of Europe
Fossils of France
Fossils of Germany
Early Devonian first appearances
Eifelian extinctions